Mehdi Abbas Khan is a Pakistani politician who was a Member of the Provincial Assembly of the Punjab, from 2008 to May 2018.

Early life and education
He was born on 15 August 1958 in Multan.

He has the degree of Master of Arts which he obtained in 1983 from Bahauddin Zakariya University.

Political career

He ran for the seat of the Provincial Assembly of the Punjab as a candidate of Pakistan Muslim League (N) (PML-N) from Constituency PP-205 (Multan-XII) in 2002 Pakistani general election but was unsuccessful. He received 25,293 votes and defeated Rana Muhammad Qasim Noon.

He was elected to the Provincial Assembly of the Punjab as a candidate of Pakistan Muslim League (Q) (PML-Q) from Constituency PP-205 (Multan-XII) in 2008 Pakistani general election. He received 35,739 votes and defeated Malik Ghulam Abbas, an independent candidate.

He was re-elected to the Provincial Assembly of the Punjab as a candidate of PML-N from Constituency PP-205 (Multan-XII) in 2013 Pakistani general election. He received 39,760 votes and defeated Malik Ghulam Abbas, a candidate of Pakistan Peoples Party (PPP).

References

Living people
Punjab MPAs 2013–2018
1958 births
Pakistan Muslim League (N) politicians
Punjab MPAs 2008–2013